The 2020–21 Cleveland State Vikings men's basketball team  represented Cleveland State University in the 2020–21 NCAA Division I men's basketball season. The Vikings, led by second-year head coach Dennis Gates, played their home games at the Wolstein Center in Cleveland, Ohio as members of the Horizon League. They finished the season 19-8, 16-4 in Horizon League play to finish as regular season co-champions. They defeated Purdue Fort Wayne, Milwaukee, and Oakland to be champions of the Horizon League tournament. They received the conference’s automatic bid to the NCAA tournament where they lost in the first round to Houston.

Previous season
The Vikings finished the 2019–20 season 11–21, 7–11 in Horizon League play to finish in a tie for seventh place. They lost in the first round of the Horizon League tournament to Oakland.

Roster

Schedule and results

|-
!colspan=12 style=| Regular season

|-
!colspan=12 style=| Horizon League tournament
|-

|-
!colspan=12 style=| NCAA tournament

|-

Source

References

Cleveland State Vikings men's basketball seasons
Cleveland State Vikings
Cleveland State Vikings men's basketball
Cleveland State Vikings men's basketball
Cleveland State